The Jimol Formation (N1j) is a fossiliferous geological formation of the Cocinetas Basin in the northernmost department of La Guajira. The formation consists of calcareous lithic and fossiliferous sandstones, siltstones and mudstones.

Etymology 
The formation was defined by Renz in 1960 and named after Cerro Jimol.

Description

Lithologies 
The Jimol Formation consists of calcareous lithic and fossiliferous sandstones, siltstones and mudstones.

Stratigraphy and depositional environment 
The Jimol Formation overlies the Uitpa Formation and is overlain by the Castilletes Formation. The age has been estimated to be Early Miocene (17.9 to 16.7 Ma), corresponding to the Santacrucian in the SALMA classification. The invertebrate fauna of the Jimol Formation is similar to the fauna found in the latest Early Miocene Cantaure Formation of Venezuela and the Culebra Formation of Panama. The Jimol Formation was deposited in a beach to shallow marine environment, inner shelf depth (less than 50 metres' [160 ft] water depth). This unit is correlated with the upper Agua Clara and lower Cerro Pelao Formations of the Venezuelan Falcón Basin.

Petroleum geology 
The Jimol Formation is a reservoir and seal rock formation in the Guajira Basin.

Fossil content

See also 

 Geology of the Eastern Hills
 Cesar-Ranchería Basin
 Honda Group
 Abanico Formation

References

Bibliography

Local geology

Paleontology

Maps 
 
 
 
 

Geologic formations of Colombia
Neogene Colombia
Miocene Series of South America
Burdigalian
Santacrucian
Sandstone formations
Siltstone formations
Mudstone formations
Beach deposits
Shallow marine deposits
Reservoir rock formations
Seal rock formations
Fossiliferous stratigraphic units of South America
Paleontology in Colombia
Geography of La Guajira Department